The 1940 Temple Owls football team was an American football team that represented Temple University as an independent during the 1940 college football season. In its first season under head coach Ray Morrison, the team compiled a 4–4–1 record and outscored opponents by a total of 155 to 113. The team played its home games at Temple Stadium in Philadelphia. Charles Drulis was the team captain.

Schedule

References

Temple
Temple Owls football seasons
Temple Owls football